Sant Francesc Xavier or Sant Francesc de Formentera is a village and capital and largest settlement of Formentera, Balearic Islands, Spain. It includes a cultural centre so visitors can learn about the village's history throughout the history of Formentera.

The football team SD Formentera is based in the village.

Sister towns
 - We`a, Djibouti

Populated places in Formentera